Eric Saucke-Lacelle (born June 14, 1989 in Sherbrooke, Quebec) is a Canadian record producer and former ice dancer. He competed with partner Karen Routhier. They are the 2009 Canadian junior national champions.

Competitive highlights
(with Routhier)

References

External links 
 

1989 births
Canadian male ice dancers
Living people
Sportspeople from Sherbrooke
21st-century Canadian people